The Bright Tribe Trust was a multi-academy trust, active in October 2015, that took on failing schools.

A new Interim Executive Board (IEB) would be brought onto the school, along with a new headteacher. Bright Tribe would cite a school's continued financial deficit, and declining pupil numbers as reasons for subsequently the pulling out of sponsorship.

Bright Tribe sponsored 10 academies in Suffolk, Essex, Greater Manchester and the North of England.

List of Schools
Haydon Bridge High School
Durham – Fyndoune community college
Durham community business college
Colchester Academy
Alde Valley Academy
The Whitehaven Academy
Castle Hill Junior School, Ipswich
Castle Hill Infant School, Ipswich
Cliff Lane, Ipswich 
Werneth Primary School in Oldham 
Haltwhistle Community Campus Upper
Haltwhistle Community Campus Lower School in Northumberland
Grindon Hall in Sunderland are also in the process of being rebrokered.

References

Multi-academy trusts